Osvaldo Castro Pelayo (born 14 April 1947) is a Chilean former professional footballer who played league football for clubs in Chile and Mexico, as well as playing international football for Chile.

Career
Castro started his career Chilean club Unión La Calera in 1965, before joining Deportes Concepción. After three seasons he transferred to Mexican side Club América.

Castro joined Club Jalisco for the 1975–76 season, scoring 26 goals in 32 league appearances. In all he scored 91 league goals for the club in his four seasons with them. Following Jalisco's removal from the Primera División, Castro returned to Chile and joined Universidad Católica for about a month. Next, he joined Deportivo Neza in 1979–80, before moving on to Atlético Potosino for 1981/82. He played his last Mexican seasons with Pumas de la UNAM, finishing with them in 1983/84.

He played for the Chile national football team on four occasions during the 1978 FIFA World Cup Qualifiers.

Following his retirement, he has worked as coach for the Pumas UNAM youth ranks.

Personal life
His nickname was Pata Bendita (Blessed Foot) since he was a young player, due to his strong shoots.

Castro made his home in Mexico City, working as a football coach, also founding the Escuela de Fútbol Colo-Colo (Colo-Colo Football Academy), where footballers such as Pablo Barrera and Luis Pérez began their career. In addition, Castro worked for the American football team Los Angeles Rams, helping players to develop strong shoots.

References

External links
 Osvaldo Castro at PlaymakerStats
 Osvaldo Castro at PartidosdeLaRoja 

1948 births
Living people
People from Copiapó
Chilean footballers
Chilean expatriate footballers
Chile international footballers
Unión La Calera footballers
Deportes Concepción (Chile) footballers
Club América footballers
Club Deportivo Universidad Católica footballers
Atlético Potosino footballers
Coyotes Neza footballers
San Luis F.C. players
Club Universidad Nacional footballers
Chilean Primera División players
Liga MX players
Chilean expatriate sportspeople in Mexico
Expatriate footballers in Mexico
1974 FIFA World Cup players
Association football forwards
Chilean football managers
Chilean expatriate football managers
Chilean expatriate sportspeople in the United States 
Expatriate football managers in Mexico
Chilean emigrants to Mexico